Chris Randall (born 1968) is an American musician, Eurorack evangelist, and the current frontman of Sister Machine Gun. In 1998, he created a side-project called Micronaut, focusing on more instrumental music that was not necessarily appropriate for Sister Machine Gun.

After disbanding Sister Machine Gun in 2007, he began his solo career and released the EP Cheap Sensation and the full-length album The Devil His Due.  Chris also collaborates with Wade Alin from Christ Analogue on the IDM project Scanalyzer.
In 2015 he rebanded Sister Machine Gun to release The Future Unformed on WTII. He was featured in the August 1996 issue of Playgirl as being among the ten sexiest male Rock musicians.

In 1998, he founded his self owned label, Positron! Records, and also runs Audio Damage, a creator of music software plug-ins and synthesizer modules.

Discography

Sister Machine Gun

1992: Sins of the Flesh
1994: The Torture Technique
1995: Burn
1997: Metropolis
1999: [R]evolution
2000: Transient 5.2 EP
2000: 6.0
2003: Influence
2015: The Future Unformed

Micronaut
1998: Micronaut
2000: Io
2002: Ganymede
2005: Europa
2006: Pasiphae
2007: Bhopal Muffin
2008: Callisto2009: Frampton, Comes Alive
2010: Resistor2010: Capacitor2010: Study OneScanalyzer
2007: On the one and the zeroSolo
Albums
2007: The Devil His Due2014: floats on airEPs
2007: Cheap Sensation''
2012: electromechanical
2020: Depth of Field

YACHT Controversy
In January 2009, Pitchfork reported that Jona Bechtolt of YACHT publicly admitted to using pirated versions of Audio Damage software. The statements resulted in three and a half-year legal battle between Bechtolt and Randall, in what Pitchfork described as a "Nerd Flame War."

References

External links
 Chris Randall's official page
 Positron! Records profile
 Audio Damage
 

American industrial musicians
Living people
1968 births
Date of birth missing (living people)
Musicians from Honolulu
Songwriters from Hawaii
Pigface members